Church Road railway station served the hamlet of Lower Machen in Newport, Wales.

History and description
The station had two platforms. There was a substantial stone building on one, with the other supplied with only a shelter. Initially a small and insignificant halt (though the suffix 'halt' did not begin appearing until the 1900s), Church Road grew in importance and a telephone kiosk was installed in 1891, together with the larger waiting room. For many years, the station's flowerbeds had its name spelt out in bedding plants.

The station's patronage slumped in the post-war years. It closed to both passengers and freight in 1957, having been unstaffed for a number of years. The larger station building is now a private residence, though the second platform was gone by 1974.

References

Disused railway stations in Caerphilly County Borough
Former Brecon and Merthyr Tydfil Junction Railway stations
Railway stations in Great Britain opened in 1865
Railway stations in Great Britain closed in 1957
1865 establishments in Wales
1957 disestablishments in Wales